Jackson Township is one of the twelve townships of Allen County, Ohio, United States.  The 2010 census found 3,056 people in the township, 2,611 of whom lived in the unincorporated portions of the township.

Geography
Located in the eastern part of the county, it borders the following townships:
Richland Township - north
Orange Township, Hancock County - northeast corner
Liberty Township, Hardin County - east
Marion Township, Hardin County - southeast corner
Auglaize Township - south
Perry Township - southwest corner
Monroe Township - west
Bath Township - northwest corner

The village of Lafayette is located in central Jackson Township.

Name and history
It is one of thirty-seven Jackson Townships statewide.

Government
The township is governed by a three-member board of trustees, who are elected in November of odd-numbered years to a four-year term beginning on the following January 1. Two are elected in the year after the presidential election and one is elected in the year before it. There is also an elected township fiscal officer, who serves a four-year term beginning on April 1 of the year after the election, which is held in November of the year before the presidential election. Vacancies in the fiscal officership or on the board of trustees are filled by the remaining trustees.

References

External links
Allen County website

Townships in Allen County, Ohio
Townships in Ohio